OK Vizura is a Serbian women's volleyball club based in Belgrade and currently playing in the Super League.

Previous names
Due to sponsorship, the club have competed under the following names:
 OK Vizura (2003–2012)
 Vizura Wall Art (2012–2013)
 Partizan Vizura (2013–2014)
 OK Vizura (2014–2017)
 OK Vizura Ruma (2017–present)

History
Established in 2003, the club made progress in the lower national leagues reaching the Super League in 2009. Since its debut at the Super League, the club has been competitive and finished second in both the Super League and Serbian Cup at the 2010–11 season. Another Cup final was reached in 2012–13.

Ahead of the 2013–14 season, the club made an agreement with Partizan Belgrade where Vizura would receive financial support and use the name, colours and logo of Partizan. The club reached another Serbian Cup final before claiming the Super League for the first time that season. Despite the successful season, the association with Partizan lasted only that season.

The club's name was changed back to OK Vizura and more success followed with the club winning another three Super Leagues (2014–15, 2015–16 and 2016–17), two Cups (2014–15 and 2015–16) and three Super Cups (2014, 2015 and 2017).

Honours

National competitions
  National League: 4
2013–14, 2014–15, 2015–16, 2016–17

  Serbian Cup: 2
2014–15, 2015–16

  Serbian Super Cup: 4
2013, 2014, 2015, 2017

Team
Season 2017–2018, as of December 2017.

See also 
 ŽOK Partizan

References

External links
 Official website 
 Profile at srbijasport.net 

Women's volleyball teams in Serbia
Volleyball clubs established in 2003
2003 establishments in Serbia
Sport in Belgrade